The 1979 FA Cup final was a football match played on 12 May 1979 at Wembley Stadium. The match was contested by Arsenal and Manchester United. It is regarded as one of the greatest-ever finishes in an FA Cup final. For over 85 minutes the game had been unremarkable, with Arsenal taking a 2–0 half time lead through goals from Brian Talbot and Frank Stapleton. In the 86th minute, however, Gordon McQueen scored following a set-piece, and two minutes later Sammy McIlroy dribbled past two Arsenal players to score a dramatic equaliser. With the game poised for extra time, United's celebrations proved short-lived, as Alan Sunderland scored a last-minute winner, making the final result Arsenal 3–2 Manchester United. This match is often referred to as the "Five-minute Final".

The 1979 FA Cup was the only major trophy that Arsenal won during the seven-year management of Terry Neill, who was appointed in 1976 after Bertie Mee's retirement. He was dismissed in 1983.

It was also the only cup final that Manchester United reached under the management of Dave Sexton, who had been appointed as manager in 1977 and remained there until 1981 when he was sacked having failed to bring a major trophy to the club.

Match details

References

External links

Match Report

FA Cup Finals
Final
Fa Cup Final 1979
Fa Cup Final 1979
FA Cup Final
FA Cup Final